Walter George "Bud" Lindenberg (September 13, 1909 – February 26, 1981) was an American professional basketball player. He played in the National Basketball League for the Fort Wayne General Electrics in 1937–38. He had also played for the Fort Wayne Hoosiers in the American Basketball League during 1930–31.

References

1909 births
1981 deaths
American Basketball League (1925–1955) players
American men's basketball players
Basketball players from Fort Wayne, Indiana
Fort Wayne General Electrics players
Guards (basketball)
Illinois Fighting Illini football players
Illinois Fighting Illini men's basketball players
Players of American football from Fort Wayne, Indiana